The 2014 NBB All-Star Game is an exhibition basketball game that will be played on February 22, 2014 at Ginásio Paulo Sarasate in Fortaleza, Ceará, home of Basquete Cearense. This game will be the 6th edition of the NBB All-Star Game and will be played during the 2013–14 NBB season. Basquete Cearense was awarded the All-Star Game in an announcement by president Cássio Roque on January 16, 2014. This will be the first time that Fortaleza is hosting the All-Star game.

The teams were formed by Brazilian players, called "NBB Brasil" (NBB Brazil), and by foreign players, called "NBB Mundo" (NBB World). The twelve players of each team were selected by the trade press, the teams' captains and coaches. Starters for the game were selected by the fans, who could select one guard, two forwards and two centers for each team.

All-Star Game

Coaches
José Alves Neto, coach of the Flamengo, and Gustavo de Conti, coach of the Paulistano, were selected as the NBB Brasil and NBB Mundo head coach, respectively. Sérgio Hernández, from Brasília, and Léo Costa, from Macaé Basquete, were selected as the NBB Brasil assistant coaches; while Demétrius Ferraciú, from Limeira, and Alberto Bial, from Basquete Cearense, were selected as the NBB Mundo assistant coaches.

Roster

Game

All-Star Weekend

Shooting Stars Competition
In the 6th edition of NBB All-Star Game, Liga Nacional de Basquete for the first time the Shooting Stars Competition of Brazilian basketball. Four teams were formed, each of them containing one NBB's player, one retired male player and one female player. For the edition, LNB selected the players who were World champions.

The mechanics of dispute Shooting Stars Competition. Each group of three players will have to transform seven shots from different positions of the court, the last of them being half-court. The maximum time for each triplet will close the circuit for two minutes. The two fastest times will qualify the decision of the tournament to be known after the big winner.

Skills Challenge 
The Skills Challenge, which will be played for the fourth time, will have the presence of three times champion Fernando Penna, from Universo/Goiânia, the guard Brandon Brown, from the host team Basquete Cearense, and six more competitors which was determined by the LNB Technical Department.

Three-Point Tournament 
The tournament will have six competitors for the title. The champion of previous season Matheus Dalla, from Limeira, and Matheus Costa, from the host city team, had already been secured in the dispute and its five rivals, with four of this five players being the four greatest three-point shooters.

Dunk Tournament 
For Dunk Tournament, the champion in the previous two seasons was the shooting guard Gui Deodato, from Bauru, while the host team, Basquete Cearense, will be represented by the center DeVon Hardin. The other challengers to the title was defined after being evaluated by a jury of personalities from basketball.

References

All